Chonespondylus is an extinct genus of Ichthyosaur. It was formally described by Leidy in 1868.

See also
 List of ichthyosaurs
 Timeline of ichthyosaur research

References

Ichthyosaurs
Mesozoic reptiles of North America